Rolanet (Robotron Local Area Network) was a networking standard, developed in the former German Democratic Republic (GDR) and introduced in 1987 by the computer manufacturer Robotron. Networking speed was 500 kBd, comparable to other standards of the day. A maximum of 253 computers could be connected using Rolanet.

Two variants of Rolanet existed:
 Rolanet 1, introduced in 1987, saw limited deployment;
 Rolanet 2 was planned as a successor to Rolanet 1, but presumably never got beyond the prototype stage.

A scaled-down version of Rolanet, BICNet, was used for educational purposes.

It is no longer possible to assemble a functioning Rolanet system today, due to lack of software and working hardware.

External links 
  More information about Robotron networking technologies on Robotrontechnik.de

Computer networking
Science and technology in East Germany